Bucculatrix telavivella is a moth in the family Bucculatricidae. It was described by Hans Georg Amsel in 1935. It is found in Italy, the Kaliningrad region and Israel.

References

Arctiidae genus list at Butterflies and Moths of the World of the Natural History Museum

Bucculatricidae
Moths described in 1935
Taxa named by Hans Georg Amsel
Moths of Europe
Moths of Asia